The 1917 Detroit Tigers football team represented the University of Detroit in the 1917 college football season. The team compiled an 8–1 record, shut out five opponents, and outscored all opponents by a combined total of 389 to 34. The team opened the season with a school record 145 to 0 victory over the Toledo Rockets. Its sole loss was to Michigan  by a 14 to 3 score. Tillie Voss starred for the 1917 team.

Coaching changes
On March 3, 1917, the University of Detroit hired Gil Dobie as its head football coach. Dobie had compiled a 58–0–3 record in nine years as head football coach at the University of Washington. Dobie was lured with the promise that he need work only three months and otherwise devote himself to business. Shortly after Dobie's hiring, a game was scheduled for the fall with Fielding H. Yost's Michigan Wolverines football team.

Dobie came to Detroit and began coaching the team through early practice sessions in August, but suddenly withdrew from the post at the end of August to become head football coach at the U.S. Naval Academy. Dobie reportedly left Detroit "because he was not satisfied with the small squad" that had turned out.

James F. Duffy, a high school coach in Detroit, was hired to take over as the team's head coach. Duffy went on to coach the team for six years.

Schedule

References

Detroit
Detroit Titans football seasons
Detroit Tigers football
Detroit Tigers football